Gorgyra kalinzu, the Kalinzu leaf sitter, is a butterfly in the family Hesperiidae. It is found in eastern Nigeria, Cameroon, Gabon, the Republic of the Congo, the Central African Republic, the central and eastern part of the Democratic Republic of the Congo, western Uganda, western Kenya, western Tanzania and Zambia. The habitat consists of forests.

References

Butterflies described in 1949
Erionotini